Mulheron is a surname. Notable people with the surname include:

Ashley Mulheron (born 1983), Scottish actress and television presenter
Danny Mulheron, New Zealand actor and television director
Eddie Mulheron (1942–2015), Scottish footballer
Tiffany Mulheron (born 1984), Scottish actress